The Ducin is a right tributary of the river Nera in Romania. It flows into the Nera near Bârz.

References

Rivers of Romania
Rivers of Caraș-Severin County